The 2000–01 Western Kentucky Hilltoppers men's basketball team represented Western Kentucky University during the 2000–01 NCAA Division I men's basketball season. The Hilltoppers were led by coach Dennis Felton and Sun Belt Conference Player of the Year Chris Marcus.  The team won the East Division Championship and the Sun Belt Basketball tournament, earning an automatic bid to the 2001 NCAA Division I men's basketball tournament.
Marcus was SBC tournament MVP and conference Defensive Player of the Year for the second consecutive year.  Nashon McPherson joined Marcus on the SBC All-Tournament team.

Schedule

|-
!colspan=6| Regular season

|-

|-
!colspan=6| 2001 Sun Belt Conference men's basketball tournament

|-
!colspan=6| 2001 NCAA Division I men's basketball tournament

References

Western Kentucky
Western Kentucky Hilltoppers basketball seasons
Western Kentucky
Western Kentucky Basketball, Men's
Western Kentucky Basketball, Men's